Minnesota's 6th congressional district includes most or all of Benton, Carver, Sherburne, Stearns, Wright, and Anoka counties. Many of the Twin Cities' northern and northwestern suburbs are included within the boundaries of this district, such as Blaine (the district's largest city), Andover, Ramsey, St. Michael-Albertville, Elk River, Lino Lakes, Forest Lake, Otsego, Buffalo, Anoka, Ham Lake, Hugo, Monticello, Waconia, East Bethel, and Big Lake. The St. Cloud Area is the other major center of population for the district, including the cities of St. Cloud (the district's second-largest city), Sartell, and Sauk Rapids. The district is Republican-leaning with a Cook Partisan Voting Index (CPVI) of R+12. It is currently represented by Republican Tom Emmer.

List of members representing the district

Recent elections

1972

Rick Nolan ran unsuccessfully for Minnesota's 6th congressional district seat in the United States House of Representatives in the election of November 7, 1972.

1974

Rick Nolan was elected in his second run on November 5, 1974, to the 94th Congress.

1976

Rick Nolan was reelected in 1976 to the 95th Congress.

1978

Nolan was reelected to the 96th Congress on November 7, 1978.

1980

Vin Weber was elected to serve in the 97th Congress.

1982

Gerry Sikorski, (DFL) was elected to the 98th Congress on November 2, 1982.

1984

Gerry Sikorski was reelected to the 99th Congress on November 6, 1984.
He continued to serve through the 100th Congress, 101st Congress and 102nd Congress.

1986 to 2006
The elected representatives were:
 Bill Luther 104th Congress,  105th Congress, 106th Congress and 107th Congress 
 Rod Grams 103rd Congress and 
 Gerry Sikorski (also served in the) 100th Congress, 101st Congress and 102nd Congress.

2002

2004

2006

2008

2010

2012

Although Bachmann's home was not within the new boundaries of the 6th district, she legally ran for reelection and won.

2014

2016

2018

2020

Presidential election voting

Historical district boundaries

See also

Minnesota's congressional districts
List of United States congressional districts

References

06
Anoka County, Minnesota
Benton County, Minnesota
Sherburne County, Minnesota
Stearns County, Minnesota
Washington County, Minnesota
Wright County, Minnesota